Conmy is a surname. Notable people with the surname include:

John Conmy (1843–1911), Irish Roman Catholic prelate
Ollie Conmy (1939–2014), Irish footballer
Patrick Anthony Conmy (born 1934), American judge